Tej Kumar Shrestha (born February 11, 1948) is a Nepalese naturalist and zoologist. Shrestha is founder secretary of the Zoological Society of Nepal. He is also a founder member of the Bird Watching Club of Nepal and has been closely associated with the wildlife conservation movement of the country for over last three decades.

He has written many books, including Wildlife of Nepal (1981) and his bestselling book Ichthyology of Nepal (2008) about fishes of Nepal.

Biography
Shrestha was born in Baglung, Dhaulagiri, on February 11, 1948, to the son of a businessman, named Pashupati Shrestha, and Chandra Kumari Shrestha. Shrestha was fascinated with fishes and bird watching, a hobby he shared with his father and grandfather Bhakti Lal Shrestha.

He studied initially at the Tribhuvan University in Nepal. He was awarded a Ph.D. in 1976 and subsequently worked at the Barkatullah University (Bhopal University) in India for DSc degree, which was awarded in 1994.  Shrestha has extensively travelled around Himalayan passes, mountains, rivers, and forests of Nepal.

He has contributed scientific papers and articles on wildlife ecology and behaviour in national and international journals. His popular articles have appeared on radio and TV in Nepal and abroad. He is the author of sixteen books on wildlife and natural resources including Wildlife of Nepal. He serves IUCN Species Survival Commission (SSC) as a member in different specialist groups.

Awards and decorations

Career 

At Tribhuvan University, starting in 1970, Shrestha achieved a series of academic promotions from Lecturer, to Associate Professor to full Professor of Zoology. Shrestha served Nepal Academy of Science and Technology 1987-1990.

Honorary affiliations

Published books

References

1948 births
20th-century naturalists
Nepalese scientists
Living people
People from Baglung District